Princess Anne of Denmark (formerly Anne Anson, Viscountess Anson, née Anne Ferelith Fenella Bowes-Lyon; 4 December 1917 – 26 September 1980) was a first cousin of Elizabeth II and the mother of royal photographer Patrick Anson, 5th Earl of Lichfield and Lady Elizabeth Shakerley. She became a Princess of Denmark through her second marriage.

Family
Anne Bowes-Lyon was born in Washington, D.C., in 1917. Her father was the Hon. John Herbert Bowes-Lyon and her mother was the Hon. Fenella Hepburn-Stuart-Forbes-Trefusis, daughter of Charles Hepburn-Stuart-Forbes-Trefusis, 21st Baron Clinton. Anne had three younger sisters, two of whom were Nerissa and Katherine Bowes-Lyon, who were institutionalized from 1941 for severe intellectual disability.

Anne's paternal grandfather was Claude Bowes-Lyon, 14th Earl of Strathmore and Kinghorne, father of her aunt Queen Elizabeth The Queen Mother, who was born Lady Elizabeth Bowes-Lyon.

Marriages
Anne married Lieutenant-Colonel Thomas William Arnold Anson (1913–1958) on 28 April 1938.  As her husband held the courtesy title of Viscount Anson, Anne was styled Viscountess Anson upon their marriage. They were divorced in 1948. They had two children, four grandchildren and six great-grandchildren:

(Thomas) Patrick John Anson (25 April 1939 – 11 November 2005), who later succeeded his grandfather as the 5th Earl of Lichfield. He married Lady Leonora Grosvenor, daughter of the Duke of Westminster, on 8 March 1975 and they were divorced circa 1986. They had three children and four grandchildren.
Lady Elizabeth Georgiana Anson (7 June 1941 – 1 November 2020), who worked as a party planner for the Queen. She married Sir Geoffrey Adam Shakerley, 6th Baronet on 27 July 1972 and they were divorced in 2009. They had one daughter and two grandchildren.

On 16 September 1950, at Glamis Castle she subsequently married Prince George Valdemar of Denmark, upon which she became Her Highness Princess Anne of Denmark.

Anne died in 1980, aged 62, in London, of a heart attack.

Ancestry

References

Citations

Bibliography

 

Bowes-Lyon family
House of Glücksburg (Denmark)
Danish princesses
Princesses by marriage
Anson
People from Washington, D.C.
1917 births
1980 deaths
Anson family